The 2002 European Promotion Cup for Women was the seventh edition of the basketball European Promotion Cup for Women, today known as FIBA Women's European Championship for Small Countries. The tournament took place in Andorra la Vella, Andorra, from 18 to 22 June 2002. Albania women's national basketball team won the tournament for the first time.

Participating teams

First round
In the first round, the teams were drawn into two groups. The first two teams from each group advance to the semifinals, the other teams will play in the 5th–7th place classification.

Group A

Group B

5th–7th place classification

Group C

Playoffs

Semifinals

3rd place match

Final

Final standings

References

FIBA Women's European Championship for Small Countries
Promotion Cup
International sports competitions hosted by Andorra
Basketball in Andorra
2002 in Andorran sport
European Promotion Cup for Women